The All-Russian Fascist Organization (VFO) (Всероссийская фашистская организация; ''Vserossiyskaya Fašistskija Organizatsiya") was a Russian white émigré group led by Anastasy Vonsyatsky. It was based in Putnam, Connecticut, United States and was founded on May 10, 1933.

In 1934, in Yokohama, the Russian Fascist Party (RFP) and VFO attempted to merge into a new entity, the All-Russia Fascist Party. On April 3, 1934, representatives from both organisations signed a protocol number 1, which proclaimed the merger of RFP and VFO and the creation of the All-Russia Fascist Party (VFP).  The new organisation was intended to connect the RFP's organizational structure with the financial resources of the VFO. April 26, 1934, in Harbin on 2-m (Unity) Congress of Russian Fascists happened formal association VFO and the RFP and the creation of the All-Russia Fascist Party.

A full merger was quite problematic however, because Vonsyatsky was an opponent of anti-Semitism and considered the support base of the RFP—primarily Russian Cossacks and the monarchists—as an anachronism. In October–December 1934 there was a split between Konstantin Rodzaevsky and Anastasy Vonsyatsky. The Vonsyatsky group remained in the RFP, but later he refounded his party as the All-Russian National Revolutionary Party. The party remained a marginal feature. It was renamed several times, eventually assuming the name All-Russian National Revolutionary Toilers and Workers-Peasants Party of Fascists

In 1940 – December 1941, the cooperation of Konstantin Rodzaevsky and Anastasy Vonsyatsky resumed, interrupted with the start of  Japanese-American War.

After the U.S. entry into World War II in 1942 Anastasy Vonsyatsky was arrested by the FBI, after which the party ceased to exist.

References

Further reading
E. Oberlander, 'The All-Russian Fascist Party', Journal of Contemporary History, Vol. 1, No. 1. (1966), pp. 158–173
 The Russian Fascists: Tragedy and Farce in Exile, 1925–1945 by John J. Stephan 
 К. В. Родзаевский. Завещание Русского фашиста. М., ФЭРИ-В, 2001 
 А.В. Окороков. Фашизм и русская эмиграция (1920–1945 гг.). М., Руссаки, 2002 
 Н.Н. Грозин. Защитные рубашки. Шанхай: Издательство Всероссийский Русский Календарь, 1939.

Political parties established in 1933
1933 establishments in Connecticut
Defunct far-right parties
Russian nationalist organizations
Political parties disestablished in 1934
Putnam, Connecticut
Far-right political parties in Russia
Fascist parties in Russia
Fascism in Russia
Anti-communist organizations
1934 disestablishments in Connecticut
Defunct nationalist parties in Russia